Thor Støre (5 February 1924 – 7 May 2001) was a Norwegian politician for the Liberal Party. He served in the position of deputy representative to the Norwegian Parliament from Oslo during the term 1969–1973.

Støre was a chess columnist for Dagbladet for many years. He was fired from Dagbladet in 1986 following a controversy over a column he'd written commemorating the 1936 unofficial Chess Olympiad in Munich. In the 1930s norwegian sports was still divided between the labour movement's organizations and the politically neutral (conservative) ones. The Workers Federation of Sports boycotted the whole Olympics, including the unofficial Chess Olympiad, whereas the Confederation of Sports athletes and chess players took part. 50 years later, in his Dagbladet chess column, Støre commented: "There is no essential difference between conservatives and nazis, it's just a matter of degrees."

The ensuing row in norwegian journalistic and chess circles mainly took place behind the scenes, enabling Dagbladet to swiftly and discreetly find a replacement to take over the chess column, and give Støre his notice. The scandal only came to the attention of a somewhat wider audience some 25 years later, 10 years after Støre had died, when the story was told by Atle Grønn in his chess column in the newspaper Dag og Tid.

Selected works
Århundrets sjakk-kamp: Verdensmesterskapet Fischer – Spasski parti for parti  ("Chess Match of the Century: The World Championship Fischer — Spassky game by game") (1973), on the Fischer–Spassky (1972 match)

References

Deputy members of the Storting
Liberal Party (Norway) politicians
Politicians from Oslo
1924 births
2001 deaths
Norwegian chess writers
Norwegian columnists